The West Indies cricket team toured New Zealand between January and March 1956 and played a four-match Test series against the New Zealand national cricket team. West Indies won the series 3–1.

West Indies team

 Denis Atkinson (captain)
 John Goddard (player-manager)
 Alfie Binns
 Clairmonte Depeiaza
 Tom Dewdney
 Wilfred Edun
 Hammond Furlonge
 Frank King
 Bruce Pairaudeau
 Sonny Ramadhin
 Alphonso Roberts
 Collie Smith
 Gary Sobers
 Alf Valentine
 Everton Weekes

Test series summary

First Test

Second Test

Third Test

Fourth Test

References

External links 
 West Indian cricket team in New Zealand in 1955-56 at ESPNcricinfo

1956 in West Indian cricket
1956 in New Zealand cricket
New Zealand cricket seasons from 1945–46 to 1969–70
1955-56
International cricket competitions from 1945–46 to 1960